Wesser is an unincorporated community in Swain County, North Carolina, United States. Wesser is located along US 74, West of  Almond and East of  Hewitt. At one time, Wesser was a whistle stop for the Southern Railway on the Murphy Branch. The Great Smoky Mountains Railway stops here during excursions. The Nantahala Outdoor Center is located in the vicinity.

References

External links
 USGS: Wesser

Unincorporated communities in Swain County, North Carolina
Unincorporated communities in North Carolina